The Rt Rev William George Hilliard (29 May 1887 – 1 February 1960) was the 5th Anglican bishop of Nelson from 1934 to 1940.

Career
Hilliard was born in Sydney on 29 May 1887, educated at the University of Sydney and ordained in 1912.  He first worked as a curate at Dulwich Hill in Sydney.  He was inducted as Rector of St John's Ashfield on 23 June 1916, and served there until 31 October 1926, when he accepted an appointment as Rector of St Clement's, Marrickville.  From 1928 to 1934 he was Headmaster of Trinity Grammar School, Summer Hill, when he was elevated to the episcopate. He resigned his see in 1940 and became Rector of St John's, Parramatta, and Coadjutor Bishop of Sydney.

Possessed of a rich, resonant voice, Hilliard had his own radio program on 2UW and appeared as a commentator on television.

Personal life
Hilliard married Lilian Constance Pearl Wooster in 1914. She died in 1918, leaving their infant son. In 1927 he married Dorothy Kezia Duval; they had three daughters. A prominent Freemason, he died on 1 February 1960.

Hilliard's paternal grandfather was the New South Wales cricketer Harry Hilliard.

References

1887 births
1960 deaths
University of Sydney alumni
Australian headmasters
Assistant bishops in the Anglican Diocese of Sydney
Anglican bishops of Nelson
20th-century Anglican bishops in New Zealand